This list of Mazda model codes describes following model codes which have been used by Mazda since the 1980s.

Naming scheme
The company's model codes form the fifth and sixth characters of the VIN on post-1981 vehicles. The first character is a letter representing the platform family, while the second is a sequential letter for the revision of the platform. For example, the Mazda N family used by the Mazda Miata started at NA and was updated in 1998 to NB and in 2006 to NC. The 2016 and newer MX-5s are designated ND.

Mazda generally starts car platforms at the letter "A", but van and truck variants often get different names, usually starting at "V".

Note: The US-built Mazda6 and Tribute do not use the Mazda model code in the VIN; in its place is an AutoAlliance code. Instead of the model code letter, position four in the VIN specifies the vehicle's safety systems, and position five specifies the marque, due to being built in a multi-brand facility.

Old VINs
Prior to 1981, Mazda used a different VIN format and model code naming scheme. The platforms were given two characters, and the model a third, based on their names.

The following pre-1981 platforms are known:
 M1 - Familia
 S1 - Capella/Savanna
 SA2 - Savanna/RX-7
 LA - Luce
 CD - Cosmo
 PA1/PA2 - Proceed

The next digit of the VIN specified the engine:
 0 - 10A/10B
 2 - 12A/12B
 3 - 13A/13B

Model codes

See also 
 List of Mazda vehicles
 List of Mazda engines

Notes

References

Mazda